This is a list of fire departments in India.

Fire departments in India

 Fire wing of Central Industrial Security Force (CISF)
 Andhra Pradesh State Disaster Response and Fire Services Department
 Chandigarh Fire and Emergency Services
 Delhi Fire Service
 Directorate of Fire and Emergency Services, Goa
 Kerala Fire And Rescue Services
 Karnataka Fire and Emergency Services
 Mumbai Fire Brigade
 Odisha Fire Service
 Tamil Nadu Fire and Rescue Services
 West Bengal Fire and Emergency Services

See also
 List of fire departments

References

Fire departments of India
India
Fire departments